Papa Bear may refer to:

 Papa Bear (Sesame Street ), a member of the Bear family on Sesame Street
 "Papa Bear" (song), a 1998 song by Keith Harling
 George Halas, American football coach
 Bill O'Reilly (political commentator), American news commentator
 One of the Berenstain Bears
 A character from Goldilocks and the Three Bears
 The son of rapper Nicki Minaj